The Men's 100m T38 had its Final held on September 12.

Medalists

Results

References
Final

Athletics at the 2008 Summer Paralympics